A. S. Lakshmi Narayanan is an audiographer - Sound Designer, Production sound mixer and sound editor from Chennai, Tamil Nadu. He is based in Trinity Digi Labs Studio. He won the National Film Award for Best Audiography for his works on acclaimed feature films Kannathil Muthamittal (2002), directed by Mani Ratnam  and Kadhalan (1994), directed by S.Shankar. He has also won the Tamil Nadu State Film Award for Best Audiographer and Kerala State Film Awards for the various regional films over the years.

Some of the iconic films Lakshminarayanan has provided sound design for include Sarkar (2018), 24 (2016), Papanasam (2015), Kaththi (2014), Thuppakki (2012), Ko (2011), 13B (2009), Sivaji: The Boss (2007), Anniyan (2005), Kannathil Muthamittal (2002), Aayitha Ezhuthu (2004), Indian (1996), Bombay (1995) and Iruvar (1997) .

Filmography

Sound Designer

External links
 

Living people
Year of birth missing (living people)
Indian audio engineers
Best Audiography National Film Award winners